Toussaint Djehi (born 1 November 1962, in Abidjan) is a former Ivorian rugby union player. He played as a prop.

Djehi played in France for Stade Poitevin Rugby (1986/87-1988/89), SC Tulle (1989/90-1990/91), Stade Rodez Aveyron (1991/92-1992/93), SO Millau (1993/94-1994/95), and once again for Stade Rodez Aveyron (1995/96-1998/99).

He had 8 caps for Ivory Coast, from 1993 to 1995, without scoring. He was called for the 1995 Rugby World Cup, playing in all the three games.

References

External links
Toussaint Djehi International Statistics

1962 births
Living people
Ivorian rugby union players
Ivorian expatriate rugby union players
Rugby union props
Sportspeople from Abidjan